Thysanodonta diadema is a species of sea snail, a marine gastropod mollusk in the family Calliostomatidae.

Description
The length of the shell attains 5 mm.

Distribution
The marine species occurs off New Caledonia.

References

External links
  Vilvens, C. & Maestrati, P., 2006. New records and three new species of Thysanodonta (Gastropoda: Calliostomatidae: Thysanodontinae) from New Caledonia. Novapex 7(1): 1–11

diadema
Gastropods described in 2006